Cibola High School is a high school for the west side of Yuma, Arizona, United States. It was the third high school opened by the Yuma Union High School District upon its 1988 establishment. The name derives from the Seven Cities of Gold, also known as "Cibola."

Athletics

Wrestling
The team has secured three state championships with the first in 1995. The team secured a runner up during the 2008 season led by then head coach Jose Pepe Moreno. The team secured back to back state championship titles on February 22, 2014, and February 14, 2015 led by the head coach Jankowski.

Notable alumni
 Efrain Escudero, NJCAA All-American wrestler; professional mixed martial artist, winner of The Ultimate Fighter 8, former UFC lightweight
 Edgar Garcia, Arizona State Wrestling Champion 2002; professional MMA fighter, UFC welterweight veteran
 Kelvin Gastelum, state champion wrestler; professional mixed martial arts fighter, winner of The Ultimate Fighter 17, currently in the UFC

References

External links
 Cibola High School website
 Yuma Union High School District website

Public high schools in Arizona
Educational institutions established in 1988
Schools in Yuma County, Arizona
Buildings and structures in Yuma, Arizona
1988 establishments in Arizona